Project management software (PMS) has the capacity to help plan, organize, and manage resource tools and develop resource estimates. Depending on the sophistication of the software, it can manage estimation and planning, scheduling, cost control and budget management, resource allocation, collaboration software, communication, decision-making, quality management, time management and documentation or administration systems.  Numerous PC and browser-based project management software and contract management software products and services are available.

History

Predecessors
The first historically relevant year for the development of project management software is 1896, marked by the introduction of the Harmonogram. Polish economist Karol Adamiecki attempted to display task development in a floating chart, and laid the foundation for project management software as it is today. 1912 was the year when Henry Gantt replaced the Harmonogram with the more advanced Gantt chart, a scheduling diagram that broke ship design tasks down for the purposes of Hoover Dam in early 1931. Today's Gantt charts are almost the same as their original counterparts and are a part of many project management systems.

Emergence of the term "project management" and modernized techniques
The term project management was not used prior to 1954 when US Air Force General Bernard Adolph Schriever introduced it for military purposes. In the years to follow, project management gained relevance in the business world, a trend which had a lot to do with the formation of the American Association of Engineers AACE (1956), and Rang and DuPont's Critical Path Method calculating project duration ever since 1957.

The trend is also related to the appearance of the Program Evaluation Review Technique (PERT) in 1958. PERT went further with monitoring projects, and enabled users to monitor tasks, being at the same time able to evaluate their quality and estimate the time needed to accomplish each of them. As with Gantt charts and CPM, PERT was invented for military purposes, this time for the US Navy Polaris missile submarine program.

In 1965, there was a new improvement in project management technology. The US department of defense presented the work breakdown structure (WBS) to dissolve projects into even smaller visual units, organizing them in a hierarchical tree structure. WBS was an inspiration for Winston Royce’s Waterfall Method (1970) where management phases are organized in a way that doesn’t allow a new task to begin before the previous ones are completed.

The first project management products and associations
In the period between 1965 and 1969 were formed two of the leading project management associations: the International Project Management Association (IPMA) in Europe, and the Project Management Institute (PMI) which trains project management professionals and issues certificates. With business shifting towards technology-based and paperless methods, the first project management systems started to emerge. Oracle and Artemis launched their project managers in 1977, while Scitor Corporation did the same in 1979. Many improvements followed in the upcoming decades: in 1986, Carnegie Mellon University’s Software Engineering Institute introduced capability maturity software, a five-level project management method for rapidly maturing processes, while in 1988 users met earned value management which added processes’ scope and cost to the schedule. The trend continued with PRINCE2 (1996) which increased the number of processes to seven, because of which developers considered designing products for managing complex projects. In 2001, they adopted the Agile project management concept and focused on adaptive planning and flexible response to changes. In 2006, users were already able to trigger total cost management, a framework that helps control and reduce costs in project management.

SaaS and cloud-based project management software
The SaaS (software-as-a-service) trend began in 2008, qualified by users as the most flexible type of project management software for their teams. In 2009, US News classified project management as one of the most demanded skills for obtaining a well-paid job.

From 2010 on, popular project management products and services were cloud-based, designed for the needs of virtual teams looking to access information from any location or device. As a result, 2012 brought mobile project management apps.

Trends
With the advent of the Internet-of-Things, project management software was developed to incorporate testing technologies, development tools, and improved cybersecurity methods.

Tasks and activities

Scheduling
One of the most common project management software tool types is scheduling tools.  Scheduling tools are used to sequence project activities and assign dates and resources to them. The detail and sophistication of a schedule produced by a scheduling tool can vary considerably with the project management methodology used, the features provided and the scheduling methods supported. Scheduling tools may include support for:
 Multiple dependency relationship types between activities.
 Resource assignment and leveling
 Critical path 
 Activity duration estimation and probability-based simulation
 Activity cost accounting.

Providing information
Project planning software can be expected to provide information to various people or stakeholders, and can be used to measure and justify the level of effort required to complete the project(s). Typical requirements might include:
 Overview information on how long tasks will take to complete.
 Early warning of any risks to the project.
 Information on workload, for planning holidays.
 Evidence.
 Historical information on how projects have progressed, and in particular, how actual and planned performance are related.
 Optimum utilization of available resource.
 Cost maintenance.
 Collaboration with each teammates and customers.
 Instant communication to collaborators and customers.

Types

Desktop
Project management software has been implemented as a program that runs on the desktop of each user. Project management tools that are implemented as desktop software are typically single-user applications used by the project manager or another subject matter expert, such as a scheduler or risk manager.

Web-based
Project management software has been implemented as a web application to be accessed using a web browser. This may also include the ability to use a smartphone or tablet to gain access to the application. Software as a service (SaaS) is also web-based and has become a common delivery model for many business applications, including project management, project management information system (PMIS) and project portfolio management (PPM).  SaaS is typically accessed by users using a thin client via a web browser.

Mobile
In recent years project management software has moved to Mobile devices. In 2015 there are more cell phones than computers in the world, therefore the move of SaaS applications to the mobile devices makes perfect sense. This migration has had the additional benefit of enabling the users to view and update project details on the go.

Open source
Project management software is often published as open source, comprising approximately half of the applications listed in the article Comparison of project management software.

Personal

A personal project management application is one used at home, typically to manage lifestyle or home projects.  There is considerable overlap with single user systems, although personal project management software typically involves simpler interfaces.  See also non-specialized tools below.

Single user
A single-user system is programmed with the assumption that only one person will ever need to edit the project plan at once.  This may be used in small companies, or ones where only a few people are involved in top-down project planning.  Desktop applications generally fall into this category.

Collaborative
A collaborative system is designed to support multiple users modifying different sections of the plan at once; for example, updating the areas they personally are responsible for such that those estimates get integrated into the overall plan.  Web-based tools, including extranets, generally fall into this category, but have the limitation that they can only be used when the user has live Internet access.  To address this limitation, some software tools using client–server architecture provide a rich client that runs on users' desktop computer and replicates project and task information to other project team members through a central server when users connect periodically to the network. Some tools allow team members to check out their schedules (and others' as read only) to work on them while not on the network.  When reconnecting to the database, all changes are synchronized with the other schedules.

Visual 
A common problem in project management is a difficulty with both viewing and understanding large amounts of fluctuating project data.  To tackle this, some project management software utilize information visualization, so that users can more easily find, analyze and make changes to their data. To avoid information overload, the visualization mantra of “overview first, zoom and filter, then details on demand” is often followed.

See also
 Comparison of project management software
 Project management

References

Further reading
Project Time Management. (2008). In A guide to the project management body of knowledge (PMBOK guide) (4th ed., p. 145). Newtown Square, Pa: Project Management Institute.